Dibona may refer to:
Aiguille Dibona, a mountain in the French Alps
VF Ivano Dibona, a hiking trail in the Italian Dolomites mountains

Persons with the surname Dibona
Angelo Dibona, the Italian mountaineer after whom the Aiguille Dibona was named
Chris DiBona, the open source and public sector engineering manager at Google
Susan DiBona, American film and television composer based in Europe

See also
G. Fred DiBona Jr. Building